This is a list of '''Fort Hays State Tigers football players in the NFL Draft.

Key

Selections
Source:

References

Lists of National Football League draftees by college football team

Fort Hays State Tigers NFL Draft